Choranche is a commune in the Isère department in southeastern France.

The grottoes were discovered end the 19th Century and hide a unique sight of fine stalactites.

Population

See also
Communes of the Isère department
Parc naturel régional du Vercors

References

Communes of Isère